Afkan (also Romanized as Afkān) is a village in Jazin Rural District, in the Central District of Bajestan County, Razavi Khorasan Province, Iran. At the 2006 census, its population was 26, in 8 families.

See also 

 List of cities, towns and villages in Razavi Khorasan Province

References 

Populated places in Bajestan County